The men's shot put event at the 1990 Commonwealth Games was held at the Mount Smart Stadium in Auckland.

Results

References

Shot
1990